Aeon was a 4,221-ton steamship built by Northumberland Shipbuilding Company, Howdon-on-Tyne for Howard Smith and Company, Melbourne in 1905.

Fate
Aeon was wrecked on 18 July 1908 near Christmas Island (now Kiritimati), while on a voyage from San Francisco to Sydney.

Notes

1905 ships
Ships built on the River Tyne
Maritime incidents in 1908
Shipwrecks in the Pacific Ocean